Dargah (also Romanized as Dargāh; also known as Darkāh) is a village in Gowharan Rural District, Gowharan District, Bashagard County, Hormozgan Province, Iran. At the 2006 census, its population was 332, in 64 families.

References 

Populated places in Bashagard County